Tennessee's 9th Senate district is one of 33 districts in the Tennessee Senate. It has been represented by Republican Steve Southerland since 2003.

Geography
District 9 is located to the northeast of Knoxville, and stretches to areas outside of the Tri-Cities region. It includes parts of the Morristown Metropolitan Area. It covers Sevier, Greene, Hamblen, Cocke, and Unicoi counties. Some notable cities in the district include Morristown, Newport, Gatlinburg, and Greeneville.

Recent election results
Tennessee Senators are elected to staggered four-year terms, with odd-numbered districts holding elections in midterm years and even-numbered districts holding elections in presidential years.

2018

2014

Federal and statewide results in District 9

References 

9
Bradley County, Tennessee
McMinn County, Tennessee
Meigs County, Tennessee
Monroe County, Tennessee
Polk County, Tennessee